is a city located in Fukui Prefecture, Japan. ,  the city has an estimated population of  23,527, with 7,973 households, and a population density of 93 persons per km². Katsuyama was the ninth-best ranking city in a ranking that compared health and sanitation in cities around the world published in April 2007.

Geography
Katsuyama is located in the Katsuyama Basin of far northern Fukui Prefecture, bordered by Ishikawa Prefecture to the north, and surrounded by mountains on all sides. The Kuzuryū River flows through part of the city. Parts of the city are within the borders of Hakusan National Park.

Neighbouring municipalities 
Fukui Prefecture
Sakai
Fukui
Ōno
Eiheiji
Ishikawa Prefecture
Kaga
Komatsu
Hakusan

Climate
Katsuyama has a Humid climate (Köppen Cfa) characterized by warm, wet summers and cold winters with heavy snowfall.

Demographics
Per Japanese census data, the population of Katsuyama has been declining over the past 50 years.

History
Katsuyama is part of ancient Echizen Province. During the Edo period, the area was divided between the holdings of Echizen-Katsuyama Domain, Fukui Domain, Ōno Domain, and Gujō Domain. Following the Meiji restoration, it was organised into part of Ōno District in Fukui Prefecture. With the establishment of the modern municipalities system on April 1, 1889, the town of Katsuyama was established. It annexed the village of Inose on April 15, 1931, On September 1, 1954, Katsuyama merged with the villages of Arado, Muraoka, Kitago, Kitadani, Shikadani, Osoha, Heisen-ji and Nomuki to form the city of Katsuyama.

Government
Katsuyama has a mayor-council form of government with a directly elected mayor and a unicameral city legislature of 16 members.

Economy
The economy of Katsuyama is primarily agricultural.

Education
Katsuyama has nine public elementary schools and three middle schools operated by the city government, and one combined private elementary/middle school. The city has one public high school operated by the Fukui Prefectural Board of Education. The prefecture also operates one special education school.

Transportation

Railway
  Echizen Railway Katsuyama Eiheiji Line
  -  -  -

Highway
 Hokuriku Expressway

International relations 
 - Aspen, Colorado, USA, friendship city

Local attractions

Fukui Prefectural Dinosaur Museum
Katsuyama Castle
Heisenji Hakusan Jinja

Notable people from Katsuyama
Unshō Ishizuka, voice actor
Akane Yamaguchi, Japanese badminton player
Genichiro Tenryu, Japanese Former Professional Wrestler

References

External links 
 
 
 
  
  

 
Cities in Fukui Prefecture